Rekers is a surname. Notable people with the surname include: 

George Rekers (born 1948), American psychologist and minister
Paul Rekers (1908–1987), American long-distance runner

See also
Ekers
Rakers